Constantin D. Nicolescu (November 5, 1887 – July 6, 1972) was a Romanian career army officer, and Minister of Defense in July–September 1940.

Biography
Born in Bucharest, he served as a second lieutenant during the Second Balkan War in 1913. During World War I, he was a captain in a cavalry regiment, and was decorated with the Order of Michael the Brave and the Legion of Honour. After being promoted to lieutenant colonel in 1923, he served as military attaché in Paris from 1925 to 1927. In 1929, with the rank of colonel, he began commanding the royal escort regiment. Made brigadier general in 1936, he entered the Defense Ministry as general secretary in 1938. In May 1940, he advanced to ministerial rank in the cabinet of Gheorghe Tătărăscu, holding office as undersecretary of state. He was elevated to the rank of divisional general in June 1940, and from July 4 to September 4, he was Defense Minister in the cabinet of Ion Gigurtu. In 1942, during World War II, he became military commander of Bucharest and was placed in charge of the 5th Army Corps in March 1943. 

Nicolescu was among the generals who prepared the King Michael's Coup of August 1944, and from November 1944 until the abolition of the monarchy in December 1947 served as head of the royal household. An adviser to King Michael I and palace marshal, he presented daily reports to the king regarding the situation on the front, commenting upon the course of the war. After the end of the war, he continued to brief the king regarding discussions within the higher army council, which debated laws and other measure touching on the military. In May 1946, the same year he was sent into the reserves, he joined the leadership of Mișcărea Națională de Rezistență, an early group within the anti-communist resistance movement. Removed from the army in January 1948 by the new communist regime, he was arrested at the end of March. Later that year, he was sentenced to seven years' imprisonment for "plotting an uprising". His family was evicted from their home and persecuted. Part of his years in prison were spent at Jilava and Aiud.

Nicolescu lived in a stately house in Bucharest; built in 1890, the 16-room mansion was located on Știrbei Vodă Street, near the Cișmigiu Gardens.

Notes

References
Stelian Neagoe, Istoria guvernelor României. Bucharest: Editura Machiavelli, 1999.

External links

1887 births
1972 deaths
Military personnel from Bucharest
Romanian Land Forces generals
Romanian Ministers of Defence
Romanian military personnel of the Second Balkan War
Romanian military personnel of World War I
Romanian military personnel of World War II
Recipients of the Order of Michael the Brave
Recipients of the Legion of Honour
Members of the Romanian anti-communist resistance movement
People detained by the Securitate
Inmates of Aiud prison
Romanian prisoners and detainees